Burns is an unincorporated community in Polk County, in the U.S. state of Missouri.

The community is located on the east side of the Pomme de Terre River at the junction of Missouri routes 32 and AA between Bolivar and Buffalo.

History
A post office called Burns was established in 1884, and remained in operation until 1920.

References

Unincorporated communities in Polk County, Missouri
Unincorporated communities in Missouri